Ouko is a Kenyan surname. Notable people with this surname include:

 Peter Ouko, Kenyan activist
 Robert Ouko (1948–2019), Kenyan athlete
 Robert Ouko (1931–1990), Kenyan politician
 William Ouko, Kenyan lawyer and jurist

Surnames of Kenyan origin